Wayne Arthur LeBombard (born June 1, 1944) is a retired American speed skater. He competed at the 1964 and 1968 Winter Olympics with the best result of 23rd place in the 1500 m in 1968.

LeBombard grew up near Milwaukee, Wisconsin, and attended Nathan Hale High School. Besides skating he competed in cycling, winning the 1963 Wisconsin and Midwest road title. After retiring from sports he briefly worked at a sales company, at a moving company and at a bike shop. In 1987 he was sentenced to 45 days in jail for stealing money from the bike shop. He was also placed on probation for drug use and ordered to attend a drug rehabilitation propgram.

References

External links
 

1944 births
Living people
American male speed skaters
Speed skaters from Milwaukee
Olympic speed skaters of the United States
Speed skaters at the 1964 Winter Olympics
Speed skaters at the 1968 Winter Olympics